Sabine Iatridou is a linguist whose work on syntax and the syntax‐semantics interface has helped to delineate theories of tense and modality.

Academic career 
Iatridou was born in Thessaloniki, spent her childhood in the Netherlands, and then returned to Greece to finish high school and attend college. She earned a DDS in 1982, an MA in Anthropology in 1986 from the University of Hawaii at Manoa, and a PhD in Linguistics from the Massachusetts Institute of Technology (MIT) in 1991. Her dissertation, under the supervision of Noam Chomsky, explored the topic of conditionals.

After graduation she worked as an Assistant Professor of Linguistics at the University of Pennsylvania, before returning to MIT to take up a position as Professor. She served as director of the MIT Linguistics PhD program for many years.

She has chaired a number of dissertations on topics in theoretical linguistics, as well many exploring semantic and syntactic structures in a range of indigenous languages, including National Science Foundation-sponsored work on Mebengokre, an underdescribed language from the Je language family, spoken in the eastern Amazon region of Brazil, and work on relative clauses in the Uto-Aztecan languages of Hiaki (Yaqui) and O'odham (Papago).

Awards 
In 1994 and in 1997 Iatridou received the National Science Foundation's Young Investigator Award.

Iatridou was inducted as a Fellow of the Linguistic Society of America in 2016.

In 2016, The University of Crete's Department of Philology awarded an honorary doctorate to Iatridou.

In 2020, she was awarded a Guggenheim Fellowship for the field of study of linguistics.

Key publications 

 Sabine Iatridou. 1990. "About agr (p)," Linguistic Inquiry.
 Sabine Iatridou. 2000. "The grammatical ingredients of counterfactuality," Linguistic Inquiry.
 Sabine Iatridou, Elena Anagnostopoulou, and Roumyana Izvorski. 2003. "Observations about the form and meaning of the Perfect."Perfect Explorations.
 Kai von Fintel and Sabine Iatridou. 2008. "How to Say Ought in Foreign: The Composition of Weak Necessity Modals," Time and modality.
 [https://www.youtube.com/watch?v=c_yNZNOK_Go “Our 'even'- Presentation at Universität Göttingen”, September 17, 2014.

References

Writers from Thessaloniki
American people of Greek descent
Linguists from the United States
Women linguists
University of Hawaiʻi at Mānoa alumni
MIT School of Humanities, Arts, and Social Sciences faculty
Living people
Fellows of the Linguistic Society of America
Year of birth missing (living people)
Massachusetts Institute of Technology alumni